Jack Betts was a journalist and columnist for the Charlotte Observer, where he  retired as the Associate Editor in 2011. Based in Raleigh, North Carolina and wrote primarily on topics related to North Carolina government and politics. Betts and his wife Martha live near Dan, Virginia.

Education
Betts graduated from the University of North Carolina at Chapel Hill in 1968.

Career
After graduating college, Betts served as a photographer in the United States Army. He then became a Washington correspondent for Greensboro Daily News, Roanoke Times, and Norfolk Virginia-Plot. He was also an editor of North Carolina Insight magazine while also being a member of the editorial board of the Observer. Here he was responsible for writing daily editorials, blogposts, and a weekly column. After working for the Charlotte Observer for 40 years, Betts decided to retire in 2011. Betts now writes a blog called Rocky Knob Blog.

Awards and honors
Betts has won awards from the North Carolina Press Association and has been inducted into the North Carolina Journalism Hall of Fame.

References

External links
Charlotte.com
"This Old State," a blog by Betts

University of North Carolina at Chapel Hill alumni
Writers from North Carolina
The Charlotte Observer people
Living people
United States Army soldiers
American male journalists
Year of birth missing (living people)